David Vinton (January 6, 1774 - July 1833) was an American silversmith, merchant, and Masonic lecturer, active in Providence, Rhode Island.

Vinton was born in Medford, Massachusetts. He was orphaned at age 4, and on December 15, 1778, his uncle, silversmith William Gowen, was appointed his guardian. He apprenticed about 1787 to David Tyler in Boston. At some point he moved to Providence, where on December 22, 1792 and January 24, 1793, he advertised in the Providence Gazette as: 
"Goldsmith and Jeweller, From Boston, Informs the Ladies and Gentlemen of Providence, and its Vicinity, that he has for sale at his Shop, the North End Corner of Market Parade and Nearly opposite, His Excellency, Governor Fenner's a complete assortment of Goldsmith's Wares . . . also Silver buckles . . . Table, Tea, Salt and Desert Spoons . . . Bracelets, etc., etc. . . . All kinds of Gold and Silverware made and repaired in the neatest manner and on the shortest notice." 
The same paper carried similar notices in 1795, but by 1796 he had become a general merchant continuing to sell spoons, bracelets, etc., and from 1799-1818 he advertised the sale of bonnets, wigs, butter, sheet music and miscellaneous musical instruments, as well as the Washington funeral medals made by Jacob Perkins of Newburyport.

Vinton married Mary Atwell on May 17, 1797, in Providence, and they had six children.

He was prominent in Freemasonry as a member of Providence's Mount Vernon Lodge No. 4. In 1816 he compiled and published a volume called "The Masonic Minstrel," of which the full title was "The Masonic Minstrel, a Selection of Masonic, Sentimental, and Amorous Songs. Duets, Glees, Canons, Rounds and Canzonets, Respectfully Dedicated to the Most Ancient and Honorable Fraternity of Free and Accepted Masons," with an appendix containing a short historical sketch of Masonry and a list of all the Lodges in the United States. It was printed for the author by H. Mann and Company and sold more than twelve thousand copies. 
In the last years of his life, he travelled as an itinerant teacher and lecturer of Masonic rituals, and in particular the York Rite degree work. This led to much controversy, however, and in 1821 he was expelled from the Grand Lodge of North Carolina for un-Masonic conduct. Although his home lodge exonerated him in 1822, his reputation was darkened. He died in July 1833 while visiting Kentucky on Masonic business, and was buried in Shakertown, Kentucky. 

His silver is collected in the Metropolitan Museum of Art and Fowler Museum at UCLA.

References 

See Also:

 History of Providence County, Rhode Island, Volume 1, Richard Mather Bayles, W. W. Preston, 1891, page 584.

American silversmiths